Sainte-Perpétue is a parish municipality in the Centre-du-Québec region of Quebec, Canada, situated along Route 259. The population as of the Canada 2011 Census was 983.

Demographics 

Population trend:

Mother tongue language (2006)

Attractions
A primarily agricultural area, Sainte-Perpétue is best known throughout the province of Quebec for its Festival du cochon (Pig festival), featuring, among other things, several days of live music, a human-versus-pig mud wrestling competition, and a boar catching competition.

See also
List of parish municipalities in Quebec

References

External links
 Festival du cochon de Sainte-Perpétue

Parish municipalities in Quebec
Incorporated places in Centre-du-Québec
Nicolet-Yamaska Regional County Municipality